Le Besco is a surname of Breton origin. It may refer to any the following people:

Besco derives from a Breton diminutive of besk which means curtailed or tailless.

 Isild Le Besco (born 1982), a French actress
 Jowan Le Besco (born 1981), a French actor, scriptwriter, director and chief cameraman
 Maïwenn Le Besco (born 1976), a French actress

References

External links
Distribution of the surname Besco in France

Surnames of Breton origin
Breton-language surnames